Ashlu Falls is a short but significant waterfall along lower Ashlu Creek.  The falls are located about 6 km above the mouth of Ashlu Creek and mark the head of Ashlu Canyon.  The creek is actually crossed by a logging road bridge between the two tiers.

Stature 
Ashlu Falls stands a total of 33 feet in height. The upper drop is about 10 feet high & its width is over 10 times its height.  The creek then flows under the bridge & bends before then dropping another 20 feet or so through a narrow chute into a deep pool.  On the north side of the lower drop is a large section of sculptured rock that, when the creek is high, is completely covered with water, making the lower tier roughly as wide as the upper tier.

References 

Waterfalls of British Columbia
New Westminster Land District